The 2011 Arkansas–Pine Bluff Golden Lions football team represented the University of Arkansas at Pine Bluff in the 2011 NCAA Division I FCS football season. The Golden Lions were led by fourth year head coach Monte Coleman and played their home games at Golden Lion Stadium. They were a member of the West Division of the Southwestern Athletic Conference and finished the 2011 season with an overall record of 6–5.

Schedule

References

Arkansas-Pine Bluff
Arkansas–Pine Bluff Golden Lions football seasons
Gold